Robert Fowler (born June 25, 1975 in Brandon, Manitoba) is a Canadian curler.

Career
Fowler was  a member of the Jeff Stoughton rink from 2006 to 2010. He was a member of the team at the 2009 Tim Hortons Brier which lost in the final to Kevin Martin. Prior to playing with Stoughton, Fowler played for such skips as Allan Lyburn, Kerry Burtnyk and Brent Scales.

Fowler has played in four Briers. In addition to the 2009 Brier, he also played in the 2007 Tim Hortons Brier, 2010 Tim Hortons Brier and 2012 Tim Hortons Brier.

As a skip, he led his team into the 2012 Safeway Championship as the tenth ranked team in the World Curling Tour. Riding on this win Fowler and the team went on to upset first Stoughton and then the number one ranked Mike McEwen in the final game to win his first provincial championship as a skip. At the Brier he went 8-3 in the round robin to finish in the 1 vs 2 game and became just the second Manitoban team from outside Winnipeg to qualify for the Brier playoffs. At his first Brier as a skip, Fowler's rink won the bronze medal, defeating the Northwest Territories/Yukon, skipped by Jamie Koe in an extra end.

Personal
Fowler owns his own Hyundai dealership. His mother is former Manitoba champion Lois Fowler and his father is also a former provincial champion Brian Fowler.

Grand slam record

References

External links
 

1975 births
Curlers from Manitoba
Living people
Sportspeople from Brandon, Manitoba
Canadian male curlers
Canada Cup (curling) participants
21st-century Canadian people